Maarten Johannes "Martin" van Rijn (born 7 February 1956) is a Dutch politician and businessman who served as Minister for Medical Care from March to July 2020. A member of the Labour Party (PvdA), he previously was CEO and Chairman of the Reinier Haga Groep (a hospital conglomerate) from 1 December 2017. He served as State Secretary at the Ministry of Health, Welfare and Sport, dealing with nursing and care, elderly policy, youth policy and biotechnology in the Second Rutte cabinet, from November 2012 to October 2017. Prior to this, he was CEO of the PGGM pension fund (2008–2012).

Career
In his capacity as a civil servant he was Director-General for health care at the Ministry of Health, Welfare and Sport from 2003 to 2007, Director-General for management and personnel policy at the Ministry of the Interior and Kingdom Relations from 2000 to 2003 and Deputy Director-General for housing at the Ministry of Housing, Spatial Planning and the Environment from 1995 to 2000.

Van Rijn studied economics at Erasmus University Rotterdam. On 15 November 2017 he was named president of the directing board of Reinier Haga Groep, managing hospitals in The Hague, Delft and Zoetermeer. On 20 March 2020, he was appointed as a replacement to the role of Minister of Medical Care due to the resignation of Bruno Bruins who collapsed from exhaustion during a parliamentary debate. He indicated he would sit on a non-partisan basis, as the Labour Party does not support the Third Rutte cabinet (a non supporting party member as minister is highly unusual in Dutch politics). He remains a member of the PvdA.

Decorations

References

External links

Official
  Drs. M.J. (Martin) van Rijn Parlement & Politiek

 

 

1956 births
Living people
Businesspeople from Rotterdam
Dutch chief executives in the finance industry
Dutch chief executives in the healthcare industry
Dutch corporate directors
Erasmus University Rotterdam alumni
Labour Party (Netherlands) politicians
Officers of the Order of Orange-Nassau
Politicians from Rotterdam
State Secretaries for Health of the Netherlands
20th-century Dutch civil servants
21st-century Dutch businesspeople
21st-century Dutch civil servants
21st-century Dutch politicians